Totoy Bato is a 2009 Philippine television drama series broadcast by GMA Network. The series is based on the graphic novel created by Carlo J. Caparas. Directed by Mac Alejandre and Don Michael Perez, it stars Robin Padilla in the title role. It premiered on February 23, 2009 on the network's Telebabad line up replacing Gagambino. The series concluded on July 3, 2009 with a total of 93 episodes. It was replaced by Rosalinda in its timeslot.

The series was released on DVD by GMA Records.

Premise
Anna Molina dreams to be a popular and successful singer someday. Her friend Arturo "Totoy Bato" Magtanggol, on the other hand, only dreams of being with his father. After his mother died, Totoy's wish comes true when his father comes home after serving his sentence, Podong turns out to be an abusive and cruel dad. Totoy's only comfort is Anna, his best friend and true love, who promised never to leave his side, but breaks her promise when her materialistic mother Matilda decides to live in Manila, she leaves Totoy with a promise that she will come back for him.

Years pass, Anna is now a famous singer in the country, and the quiet life of Totoy will be disturbed when a land grabber appears and kills his loving wife Elena. Madness and revenge engulfs Totoy and he promises to fight the manipulative haciendero no matter what. Totoy decides to start a new life in Manila — where faces more fights, this time in the boxing arena where he will be known as Totoy Bato.

Cast and characters

Lead cast
 Robin Padilla as Arturo "Totoy Bato" Magtanggol

Supporting cast
 Regine Velasquez as Anna Molina
 Eddie Garcia as Fredo
 Manny Pacquiao as himself
 Ehra Madrigal as Trixie Altamirano-Magtanggol
 Ara Mina as Elena Magtanggol
 Ian Veneracion as Miguel Velarde
 Caridad Sanchez as Concha Velarde
 Joonee Gamboa as Mauro Magtanggol
 Ronnie Lazaro as Podong Magtanggol
 Rommel Padilla as Manuel Velarde
 Deborah Sun as Matilda Molina
 Jolo Revilla as Andong
 LJ Reyes as Gilette Molina
 Tuesday Vargas as Connie
 Mon Confiado as Turko Manzano
 Sweet Ramos as Cecilia Magtanggol
 Ralph Padilla as Steve Altamirano
 Queenie Padilla as Heather Hernandez

Recurring cast
Menggie Cobarrubas as mayor of Barrio Grapas
BJ Forbes as Bogart
Martin Delos Santos as Boyet
Kirby de Jesus as Sakrestan
Val Iglesias Sr. as Temi
Val Iglesias Jr. as Ruben
Joseph Bitangcol as a doctor
Jun Hidalgo as Berong 
Jessy Mendiola as Maurice / Light Milton
Bela Padilla as Rain
Carlo Aquino as teen Totoy
Camille Prats as teen Anna
July Hidalgo as Millton / Dark Milton
Ernie Garcia as Cecillia's doctor
Gay Balignasay as a news reporter
John Apacible
Dido dela Paz
Ricardo Cepeda
Michael Flores

Ratings
According to AGB Nielsen Philippines' Mega Manila household television ratings, the pilot episode of Totoy Bato earned a 36.7% rating. While the final episode scored a 30.4% rating.

Accolades

References

External links
 

2009 Philippine television series debuts
2009 Philippine television series endings
Fantaserye and telefantasya
Filipino-language television shows
GMA Network drama series
Television shows based on comics
Television shows set in the Philippines